The Bay Boy is a 1984 Canadian drama film. It is a semi-autobiographical film based on director Daniel Petrie's experiences of growing up in Glace Bay, a mining town on Cape Breton Island, during the Great Depression. It features the screen debut of Kiefer Sutherland as the film's central character, alongside Liv Ullmann as his character's mother.

Plot
In 1937, Donald Campbell (Kiefer Sutherland) is a sensitive 16-year-old boy coming of age in a dark and uncertain time for both his community and life. His mother (Liv Ullmann) wants him to continue his education after high school and become a priest, but Donald is more interested in girls than prayerbooks. He is also frightened after a visiting priest attempts to molest him.

Meanwhile, when he is not in school, Donald spends his time helping his father (Peter Donat) dig a bootleg pit; helps care for his older brother, Joe (Peter Spence), who was the brightest boy in his grade until he got sick and was left disabled; and pursues Saxon Coldwell (Leah Pinsent), one of police Sergeant Coldwell's two daughters.  Sergeant Coldwell's wife died a few months earlier.

Donald lives a hard-working but fairly happy life, until the night he witnesses Sergeant Coldwell shoot and kill the Jewish couple who are his landlord and landlady.  The chief of police is a relative, so Donald feels comfortable admitting he saw the killing but he says he did not see who did it, because he is afraid of Sergeant Coldwell - especially after Sergeant Coldwell subsequently lets Donald know that he is aware that Donald did see who committed the murder (because he could not have seen the shooting without also seeing who did it).  When the Sergeant comes home and finds Donald (innocently) visiting with his daughter Dianna, he orders him out of the house but not without hitting him with his belt a few times first.  The Sarge turns his attention on Dianna and begins to violently discipline her when Donald snaps and tells him he's going to the Chief to finally tell him the Sarge was the murderer.  After a short pursuit, Coldwell catches and tries to kill the boy - with the result, his secret is revealed and he is arrested for the murder of the Jewish couple, child abuse, and attempted murder of Donald.

Later, in spite of his strong attraction to both of Coldwell's daughters, Donald eagerly loses his virginity to the sexually experienced Mary, the brightest girl in his class, who seduces him in her empty home while the two are studying. They agree to regularly meet to have sex, but this does not lead to any lasting relationship. The Coldwell girls have to move away, and Donald sadly bids farewell to them, while preparing to leave home himself to study. He tells his mother he does not intend to become a priest — which she accepts philosophically.

The film also depicts the daily lives of the eccentric locals and tight-knit families.

Cast

Production
The film was shot entirely on location in Cape Breton, and primarily in Glace Bay.  Many of the extras are performed by local residents. Principal photography took place from November 3 to December 17, 1983.

Awards
The film won the Genie Award for Best Canadian Film, Screenplay, Supporting Actor (Alan Scarfe), Art Direction, Costumes and Sound

Home video
The film was released on home video in the United States under the title Bad Company.

References

External links
Canadian Film Encyclopedia [A publication of The Film Reference Library/a division of the Toronto International Film Festival Group]
 
 The AV Trust's newsletter PreserVision.  Issue 7 (Spring 2006) features an article on The Bay Boy and "losing" films.
 

1984 films
English-language Canadian films
Films set in Nova Scotia
Best Picture Genie and Canadian Screen Award winners
Orion Pictures films
Films directed by Daniel Petrie
Films shot in Nova Scotia
Canadian coming-of-age drama films
Films set in 1937
Films produced by John Kemeny
Films scored by Claude Bolling
1980s English-language films
1980s Canadian films